Breadcrumbs is a 2016 Spanish-Uruguayan drama film directed by Manane Rodríguez, starring Cecilia Roth and Justina Bustos. It was selected as the Uruguayan entry for the Best Foreign Language Film at the 89th Academy Awards but it was not nominated. It was selected by Uruguay to compete for the Oscar 2017 to Best non-English speaking film.

Plot
The young Liliana Pereira (Justina Bustos), in Montevideo, a university student and mother of a baby, participates in student struggles against the Civic-Military Dictatorship in Uruguay. Together with other women, she is kidnapped, locked up and tortured, and dispossessed of her son's parental rights. Mutual support with her confinement partners strengthens and accompanies her. After years of exile in Spain, and upon learning that she will be a grandmother, Liliana Pereira (Cecilia Roth) decides to return to Uruguay to participate with her ex-companions in denouncing the hell suffered in her youth and to recover the sentimental ties with her son.

Cast
 Cecilia Roth as Liliana Pereira
 Justina Bustos as Liliana Pereira
 María Pujalte
 Margarita Musto
 Patxi Bisquert
 Ernesto Chao
 Quique Fernández
 Andrea Davidovics
 Ignacio Cawen
 Stefanía Crocce
 Sonia Méndez
 Nuria Fló
 Sergio Quintana 
 María Vidal
 Artur Trillo

See also
 List of submissions to the 89th Academy Awards for Best Foreign Language Film
 List of Uruguayan submissions for the Academy Award for Best Foreign Language Film

References

External links
 

2016 films
2016 drama films
Spanish drama films
Uruguayan drama films
2010s Spanish-language films
2010s Spanish films